Tiro is a village in Crawford County, Ohio, United States. The population was 280 at the 2010 census.

Geography
Tiro is located at  (40.906753, -82.772054).

Demographics

2010 census
As of the census of 2010, there were 280 people, 85 households, and 71 families living in the village. The racial makeup of the village was 96.8% White, 0.7% African American, 0.7% Asian, and 1.8% from two or more races. Hispanic or Latino of any race were 3.9% of the population.

There were 85 households, of which 43.5% had children under the age of 18 living with them, 57.6% were married couples living together, 21.2% had a female householder with no husband present, 4.7% had a male householder with no wife present, and 16.5% were non-families. 14.1% of all households were made up of individuals, and 4.8% had someone living alone who was 65 years of age or older. The average household size was 3.29 and the average family size was 3.54.

The median age in the village was 35.6 years. 31.1% of residents were under the age of 18; 9.5% were between the ages of 18 and 24; 25.5% were from 25 to 44; 20.3% were from 45 to 64; and 13.6% were 65 years of age or older. The gender makeup of the village was 49.6% male and 50.4% female.

2000 census
As of the census of 2000, there were 281 people, 103 households, and 76 families living in the village. The population density was 682.4 people per square mile (264.6/km). There were 109 housing units at an average density of 264.7 per square mile (102.6/km). The racial makeup of the village was 98.22% White, 1.07% Asian, and 0.71% from two or more races. Hispanic or Latino of any race were 1.78% of the population.

There were 103 households, out of which 38.8% had children under the age of 18 living with them, 60.2% were married couples living together, 7.8% had a female householder with no husband present, and 26.2% were non-families. 21.4% of all households were made up of individuals, and 8.7% had someone living alone who was 65 years of age or older. The average household size was 2.73 and the average family size was 3.17.

In the village, the population was spread out, with 33.5% under the age of 18, 5.7% from 18 to 24, 27.8% from 25 to 44, 21.4% from 45 to 64, and 11.7% who were 65 years of age or older. The median age was 34 years. For every 100 females there were 102.2 males. For every 100 females age 18 and over, there were 105.5 males.

The median income for a household in the village was $30,750, and the median income for a family was $30,357. Males had a median income of $26,964 versus $23,125 for females. The per capita income for the village was $12,670. About 9.0% of families and 13.2% of the population were below the poverty line, including 19.2% of those under the age of eighteen and none of those 65 or over.

Festivals
Tiro is home to the Testicle Festival every spring, featuring cooked testicles.  This event is put on by the Tiro Tavern, a bar/diner located in Tiro.

The Testicle Festival was promoted by a contestant in a 2016 episode of the Ohio Lottery game show Cash Explosion during an unintentional blooper of a contestant interview conducted by hostess Sharon Bicknell.

Notable person
 Russell Coffey, one of the last surviving World War I veterans

References

Villages in Crawford County, Ohio
Villages in Ohio